Esfahak (also Romanized as Eşfahak; also known as Aspāk) is a village in Deyhuk Rural District, Deyhuk District, Tabas County, South Khorasan Province, Iran. At the 2006 census, its population was 726, in 192 families.

References 

Populated places in Tabas County